Caroline Carpentier (born 9 September 1958) is a French former swimmer. She competed in the women's 4 × 100 metre freestyle relay at the 1976 Summer Olympics.

References

External links
 

1958 births
Living people
Olympic swimmers of France
Swimmers at the 1976 Summer Olympics
Place of birth missing (living people)
Mediterranean Games gold medalists for France
Mediterranean Games medalists in swimming
Swimmers at the 1975 Mediterranean Games
French female freestyle swimmers
20th-century French women
21st-century French women